Jacques Lipchitz (26 May 1973) was a Cubist sculptor. Lipchitz retained highly figurative and legible components in his work leading up to 1915–16, after which naturalist and descriptive elements were muted, dominated by a synthetic style of Crystal Cubism. In 1920 Lipchitz held his first solo exhibition, at Léonce Rosenberg's Galerie L'Effort Moderne in Paris. Fleeing the Nazis he moved to the US and settled in New York City and eventually Hastings-on-Hudson.

Life and career
Jacques Lipchitz was born Chaim Jacob Lipschitz, in a Litvak family, son of a building contractor in Druskininkai, Lithuania, then within the Russian Empire. He studied at Vilnius grammar school and Vilnius Art School. Under the influence of his father he studied engineering in 1906–1909, but soon after, supported by his mother he moved to Paris (1909) to study at the École des Beaux-Arts and the Académie Julian.

It was there, in the artistic communities of Montmartre and Montparnasse, that he joined a group of artists that included Juan Gris and Pablo Picasso as well as where his friend, Amedeo Modigliani, painted Jacques and Berthe Lipchitz.

Living in this environment, Lipchitz soon began to create Cubist sculpture. In 1912 he exhibited at the Salon de la Société Nationale des Beaux-Arts and the Salon d'Automne with his first solo show held at Léonce Rosenberg's Galerie L'Effort Moderne in Paris in 1920. In 1922 he was commissioned by the Barnes Foundation in Merion, Pennsylvania to execute seven bas-reliefs and two sculptures.

With artistic innovation at its height, in the 1920s he experimented with abstract forms he called transparent sculptures. Later he developed a more dynamic style, which he applied with telling effect to bronze compositions of figures and animals.

In 1924-25 Lipchitz became a French citizen through naturalization and married Berthe Kitrosser. With the German occupation of France during World War II, and the deportation of Jews to the Nazi death camps, Lipchitz had to flee France. With the assistance of the American journalist Varian Fry in Marseille, he escaped the Nazi regime and went to the United States. There, he eventually settled in Hastings-on-Hudson, New York.

He was one of 250 sculptors who exhibited in the Third Sculpture International Exhibition held at the Philadelphia Museum of Art in the summer of 1949. He has been identified among seventy of those sculptors in a photograph Life magazine published that was taken at the exhibition. In 1954 a Lipchitz retrospective traveled from The Museum of Modern Art in New York to the Walker Art Center in Minneapolis and The Cleveland Museum of Art. In 1959, his series of small bronzes To the Limit of the Possible was shown at Fine Arts Associates in New York.

In his later years Lipchitz became more involved in his Jewish faith, even referring to himself as a "religious Jew" in an interview in 1970. He began abstaining from work on Shabbat and put on Tefillin daily, at the urging of the Lubavitcher Rebbe, Rabbi Menachem Schneerson.

Beginning in 1963 he returned to Europe for several months of each year and worked in Pietrasanta, Italy. He developed a close friendship with fellow sculptor, Fiore de Henriquez. In 1972 his autobiography, co-authored with H. Harvard Arnason, was published on the occasion of an exhibition of his sculpture at the Metropolitan Museum of Art in New York.

Death and legacy
Jacques Lipchitz died in Capri, Italy. A contingent including Rabbi Gershon Mendel Garelik flew with his body to Jerusalem for the burial.

His Tuscan Villa Bozio was donated to Chabad-Lubavitch in Italy and currently hosts an annual Jewish summer camp in its premises.

Selected works

Sailor with Guitar – 1917
Drawing of a sculpture – 1916
Bather – 1916–17
Woman with Book – 1918, at Carleton College
Bather, bronze – 1923–1925
Reclining Nude with Guitar – 1928, a prime example of Cubism
Dancer with Veil – 1928
Dancer – 1929
The Song of the Vowels – (Le Chant des Voyelles), – 1931 cast bronze sculptures at Cornell University; Princeton University; UCLA; Stanford University; Kykuit Estate Gardens (New York), Paris, and the Kröller-Müller Museum (Netherlands)
Bull and Condor – 1932
Bust of a Woman – 1932
David and Goliath – 1933
Embracing Figures – 1941
Prometheus Strangling the Vulture – 1944
Birth of the Muses 1944–1950, Massachusetts Institute of Technology (MIT) campus, Cambridge, Massachusetts
Rescue II- 1947
Mother and Child – 1949 at the Honolulu Museum of Art
John F. Kennedy Memorial, London - 1965. This was originally on Marylebone Road but from 2019 has been in the lobby of the International Students House, London at 229 Great Portland Street
Daniel Greysolon, Sieur du Lhut - 1965 at the University of Minnesota Duluth
Bellerophon Taming Pegasus: Large Version – 1966–1977, begun in 1966 and arrived at Columbia Law School in pieces for assembly in 1977
Peace on Earth – 1967–1969
Government of the People – 1976

Gallery

See also
 Crystal Cubism

References
Arnason H. Harvard and Jacques Lipchitz. My Life in Sculpture. New York: Viking Press, 1972.
 Hammacher, Abraham Marie, Jacques Lipchitz, His Sculpture, New York, H.N. Abrams, 1961.
 Hope, Henry Radford, The Sculpture of Jacques Lipchitz, New York, Plantin press, printed for the trustees of the Museum of Modern Art, 1954.
 Lipchitz, Jacques, My Life in Sculpture, New York, Viking Press, 1972.
 Stott, Deborah A., Jacques Lipchitz and Cubism, New York, Garland Pub., 1978.
 Van Bork, Bert, Jacques Lipchitz, The Artist at Work, New York, Crown Publishers, 1966.
 Wilkinson, Alan G., Jacques Lipchitz, A Life in Sculpture, Toronto, Canada, Art Gallery of Ontario, 1989.
 Dr Catherine Putz, Jacques Lipchitz: Master Drawings, Ben Uri Gallery and Museum, 2009.

Notes

External links

 
 Jacques Lipchitz, Agence Photographique de la Réunion des musées nationaux et du Grand Palais des Champs-Elysées
 Bruce Bassett papers relating to Jacques Lipchitz, circa 1961–2001  from the Smithsonian Archives of American Art
  "Ask Jacques Lipchitz a Question: Jacques Lipchitz interviews during the summers of 1970–1972", Bruce W. Bassett, interviewer and video producer. The Israel Museum, Jerusalem donated by Hanno D. Mott, New York for the family of Jacques Lipchitz. Interactive online version published 2010
 Lipchitz, Jacques,  Encyclopedia Treccani.it (Italian)
 

1891 births
1973 deaths
People from Druskininkai
People from Grodnensky Uyezd
Lithuanian Jews
Emigrants from the Russian Empire to France
French people of Lithuanian-Jewish descent
French emigrants to the United States
American people of Lithuanian-Jewish descent
20th-century American printmakers
20th-century American sculptors
20th-century American male artists
20th-century French sculptors
American male sculptors
Cubist artists
French sculptors
Jewish sculptors
Jewish artists
Lithuanian sculptors
Modern sculptors
People from Hastings-on-Hudson, New York
School of Paris
 01
Académie Julian alumni
People of Montmartre
Members of the American Academy of Arts and Letters